The River-class destroyer (re-designated in 1913 as the E class)  was a class of torpedo boat destroyer built for the Royal Navy at the turn of the 20th century, and which saw extensive service in World War I. The class introduced new features to destroyer design, placing a greater emphasis on seakeeping and endurance and less on a high maximum speed in good weather. All the ships were named after British and Irish rivers, and as such were the first Royal Navy destroyer class to be named systematically.

Genesis
The concept for the River class began in December 1900, with a request from John de Robeck, then the senior destroyer officer in the Mediterranean Fleet, for a new class of destroyer with a longer range than the existing "30-knotter" B, C and, D classes and "27-knotter" A-class types.

Robeck also called for various modifications to destroyer design to help make ships more seaworthy, in particular keeping up their speed in adverse weather conditions. The most noticeable change would be to introduce a raised forecastle rather than an arched turtleback for the hull forward of the bridge, and that the bridge should be placed further aft to keep it clear of spray from waves breaking over the bow. Furthermore, he felt that destroyers should run their speed trials with a more realistic load of fuel and supplies. The "30-knotter" type might have a nominal speed of 30 knots, but even in very good weather this was never achieved in service.

Other officers serving on Royal Navy destroyers made similar observations about their ships. Robeck's commanding officer, Admiral "Jackie" Fisher, drew a comparison with the German , which had impressed Royal Navy officers who had seen it.

In July 1901 the Director of Naval Construction worked on sketch designs for future destroyers, which included many of the features Robeck and his colleagues advocated, as well as a heavier and more reliable kind of engine. While this speed seemed like a significant reduction, it would be measured with a realistic 95 tons of coal loaded on board, and the better seakeeping properties meant that the new ships would perform better than a "30-knotter" in any seas except for a flat calm.

Design

As with other early British destroyer classes, the Admiralty invited specialist private firms to submit their own designs for destroyers which would meet the specification. The idea was to use the builders' knowledge of building small, fast, ships to help cram powerful machinery into a small hull. For this reason, details of the hull and internal arrangements differed between ships in the class.

Nevertheless, the River class can clearly be distinguished from previous destroyers because of its raised forecastle. Previous British designs had a low "turtle-back" forecastle, which, although intended to clear the bows, caused them to dig in to the sea, resulting in a very wet conning position. The bridge was also further back than in previous destroyer models.

All ships were coal fired and all but three had triple expansion steam engines; Eden, Stour and Test were powered by steam turbines. Eden was given turbines to test their viability for future destroyer classes, with two propellers on each of her three shafts, to transmit the power at the high revolutions of the direct drive turbines, a feature of the earlier .

By 1906 the Russo-Japanese War had shown that the 6-pounder gun was insufficiently effective, so the five 6-pounders in this class were replaced by three additional 12-pounders, creating an "all big gun" armament.

Performance
With a general increase in size and more solid construction, the Rivers became the first truly oceangoing and useful torpedo boat destroyers in Royal Navy service.

Despite making only 25 knots (previous classes had made  under the most favourable conditions), the increased seaworthiness meant that they could maintain this speed into a sea and that they remained workable and fightable at the same time. Notwithstanding a variety of design differences, all ships had either two broad funnels or two pairs of narrow funnels.

All ships surviving the war were sold out of service by late 1920.

Ships

Thirty-four ships were ordered - ten ships under the 1901-02 Programme, eight ships under the 1902-03 Programme (with one extra purchased when Palmers built it on speculation), and fifteen ships under the 1903-04 Programme; two additional vessels (also built on speculation) were purchased in 1909 under the 1908-09 Programme.

Hawthorn Leslie type; all built by Hawthorn Leslie, Hebburn, Newcastle upon Tyne. They featured two short funnels.
Derwent – launched 14 February 1903, mined and sunk off Le Havre 2 May 1917.
Eden – launched 13 March 1903, rammed and sunk by SS France in English Channel 18 June 1916.
Waveney – launched 15 March 1903, sold for breaking up 10 February 1920.
Boyne – launched 12 September 1904, sold for breaking up 30 August 1919.
Doon – launched 8 November 1904, sold for breaking up 27 June 1919.
Kale – launched 8 November 1904, mined and sunk in North Sea 27 March 1918.
Palmer type; all built by Palmers Shipbuilding and Iron Company, Jarrow.  They featured four funnels closely paired.
Erne – launched 14 January 1903, wrecked off Rattray Head 6 February 1915.
Ettrick – launched 28 February 1903, sold for breaking up 27 May 1919.
Exe – launched 27 April 1903, sold for breaking up 10 February 1920.
Cherwell – launched 23 July 1903, sold for breaking up 23 June 1919.
Dee – launched 10 September 1903, sold for breaking up 23 July 1919.
Rother – launched 5 January 1904, sold for breaking up 23 June 1919.
Swale – launched 20 April 1905, sold for breaking up 23 June 1919.
Ure – launched 25 October 1904, sold for breaking up 27 May 1919.
Wear – launched 21 January 1905, sold for breaking up 4 November 1919.
Yarrow type; all built by Yarrow Shipbuilders, Poplar, London.  They featured four funnels openly paired and no raised piece in the eyes.
Ribble – launched 19 March 1904, sold for breaking up 29 July 1920.
Teviot – launched 7 November 1903, sold for breaking up 23 June 1919. 
Usk – launched 25 July 1903, sold for breaking up 29 July 1920.
Welland  – launched 14 April 1904, sold for breaking up 30 June 1920.
Gala – launched 7 January 1905, collided with HMS Attentive and sank 27 April 1908 off Harwich.
Garry – launched 21 March 1905, sold for breaking up 22 October 1919.
Laird type; all built by Laird Brothers (from 1903 Cammell Laird), Birkenhead and included two ships built on speculation and purchased by the Royal Navy.  They featured two medium funnels.
Foyle  – launched 25 February 1903, mined and sunk in Straits of Dover 15 March 1917.
Itchen – launched 17 March 1903, torpedoed and sunk by U-boat U-99 in the North Sea 6 July 1917.
Arun – launched 29 April 1903, sold for breaking up 30 June 1920.
Blackwater – launched 25 July 1903, sunk in collision with SS Hero 6 April 1909 off Dungeness.
Liffey – launched 23 September 1904, sold for breaking up 23 June 1919.
Moy – launched 10 November 1904, sold for breaking up 27 May 1919.
Ouse – launched 7 January 1905, sold for breaking up 22 October 1919.
Stour – built on speculation, launched 3 June 1905, purchased in December 1909, sold for breaking up 30 August 1919.
Test – built on speculation, launched 6 May 1905, purchased in December 1909, sold for breaking up 30 August 1919.
Thornycroft type; all built by J I Thornycroft, Chiswick.  They featured two high funnels.
Kennet  – laid down 5 December 1902, launched 4 December 1903, and completed in January 1905; sold for breaking up 11 December 1919.
Jed – laid down 27 February 1903, launched 16 February 1904, and completed in January 1905; sold for breaking up 29 July 1920.
Chelmer – laid down 11 February 1904, launched 8 December 1904, and completed in June 1905; sold for breaking up 30 June 1920.
Colne – laid down 21 March 1904, launched 21 May 1905, and completed in July 1905; sold for breaking up 4 November 1919.
White type; both built by J. Samuel White, Cowes.
Ness – launched 5 January 1905, sold for breaking up 27 May 1919.
Nith – launched 7 March 1905, sold for breaking up 23 June 1919.

Notes

Citations

References

 

Destroyer classes
 
Ship classes of the Royal Navy